Gawler was an electoral district of the House of Assembly in the Australian state of South Australia from 1938 to 1970.

The polling places in the Electorate of Gawler for the 1938 were Cockatoo Valley, Gawler, Gawler Blocks, Gawler South, Loos, Lyndoch, One Tree Hill, Rosedale, Roseworthy, Rowland's Flat, Smithfield,
Wasleys, Willaston and Williamstown.

Gawler was abolished in a boundary redistribution in 1970, John Clark represented the newly created district of Electoral district of Elizabeth from 1970.

The town of Gawler is currently represented by the seat of Light.

Members

Election results

References 

Former electoral districts of South Australia
1938 establishments in Australia
1970 disestablishments in Australia